The San Francisco FlameThrowers were a professional ultimate team from the San Francisco Bay Area, playing in the  West Division of the American Ultimate Disc League. The team was founded in 2014 when the league expanded to the west coast. In 2017, the Flamethrowers won the AUDL Championship game, with a final score of 30-29 over the Toronto Rush. The FlameThrowers folded after the 2018 season, but maintained rights to the FlameThrower brand and hinted at a rebirth as a women's team.

References

Sports teams in Oakland, California
Defunct ultimate (sport) teams
2014 establishments in California
Ultimate teams established in 2014
Ultimate teams disestablished in 2018
2018 disestablishments in California